The 1959–60 Hamburger SV season was the 13th consecutive season playing in the Oberliga Nord, the first-tier of football in the region. Hamburg also competed in this season's editions of the German football championship and the 1958–59 DFB-Pokal, which was contested in the late autumn of 1959.

In 1960, HSV became German champions for the first time since 1928, defeating 1. FC Köln 3–2 in the championship final. Seeler, who scored twice in the final, was named the inaugural winner of the West German Footballer of the Year.

Competitions

Overall record

Oberliga Nord

League table

German football championship

Results

DFB Pokal

Results

References

Hamburger SV seasons
Hamburger
German football championship-winning seasons